Visions of the Lifted Veil is the second release for Chicago-based Fashion Bomb.  The album was produced by Raymond Herrera(Fear Factory, Arkaea),and Jeremy Blair(Guns N’Roses, Fear Factory, Cypress Hill, Ice Cube) and recorded at Temple Studios in Los Angeles, CA. Tom Baker (Marilyn Manson, NIN, Rob Zombie) of Precision Mastering mastered the album. The album art was designed by Stephen Jensen of F3 Studios.

Track listing
 "S=K Logw”
 "The Meek”
 "The Vow”
 "Veil of Megiddo”
 "Sick One”
 "The Stalker”
 "Technological Singularity”
 "Press Delete”
 "Wasted World”
 "Crucify”
 "Detritivore”
 "The World Will End with Us”
 "A Dialogue Between the Spirit and Dust”

References

Fashion Bomb albums
2009 albums